Kitahana is an administrative ward in Muhambwe Constituency in Kibondo District of Kigoma Region in Tanzania. 
In 2016 the Tanzania National Bureau of Statistics report there were 14,439 people in the ward, from 24,431 in 2012.

References

Kibondo District
Wards of Kigoma Region
Constituencies of Tanzania